Idaea humiliata, the Isle of Wight wave, is a moth of the family Geometridae. It is found in Europe. This species was found on the Isle of Wight but became extinct around 1931. There was one sighting in Portsmouth in 1954 but the moth appears to be currently extinct in the United Kingdom.

The species has a wingspan of 19–22 mm. The adults fly in one generation in July.

The larvae feed on knotgrass, dandelion and dock in captivity. It is unknown what the natural foodplant is.

Notes
The flight season refers to the British Isles. This may vary in other parts of the range.

External links

Isle of Wight wave at UK Moths
Fauna Europaea
Lepiforum.de

Sterrhini
Moths of Europe
Moths described in 1767
Taxa named by Johann Siegfried Hufnagel